The Nabob is a comedy play by the English writer Samuel Foote. It was first performed at the Haymarket Theatre on 29 June 1772. The first interpretation of the role of Mrs Matchem was made by Mrs Gardner.

A wealthy nabob Sir Matthew Mite returns to England from India and tries to buy his way into high society.

References

Bibliography
 Nechtman, Tillman W. Nabobs: Empire and Identity in Eighteenth-Century Britain. Cambridge University Presses, 2010.
 Taylor, George (ed). Plays by Samuel Foote and Arthur Murphy. Cambridge University Press, 1984.

Plays by Samuel Foote
1772 plays
Plays set in the 18th century